Margaret I (March 1353 – 28 October 1412) was Queen regnant of Denmark, Norway, and Sweden (which included Finland) from the late 1380s until her death, and the founder of the Kalmar Union that joined the Scandinavian kingdoms together for over a century. She had been queen consort of Norway from 1363 to 1380 and of Sweden from 1363 to 1364 by marriage to Haakon VI of Norway. Margaret was known as a wise, energetic and capable leader, who governed with "farsighted tact and caution," earning the nickname "Semiramis of the North". She was derisively called "King Breechless", one of several derogatory nicknames invented by her rival Albert of Mecklenburg, but was also known by her subjects as "Lady King", which became widely used in recognition of her capabilities. Knut Gjerset calls her "the first great ruling queen in European history."

The youngest daughter of Valdemar IV of Denmark, Margaret was born at Søborg Castle. She was a practical, patient administrator and diplomat, albeit one of high aspirations and a strong will, who intended to unite Scandinavia forever into one single entity with the strength to resist and compete against the might of the Hanseatic League. In 1363, aged ten, Margaret married Haakon VI. They had a son, Olaf. Following the deaths of her husband and son, Margaret was proclaimed queen of the Scandinavian kingdoms. She was ultimately succeeded by a grandnephew, Eric of Pomerania. Although Eric came of age in 1401, Margaret continued for the remaining 11 years of her life to be sole ruler in all but name. Her regency marked the beginning of a Dano-Norwegian union which was to last for more than four centuries.

Some Norwegian and Swedish historians have criticized Margaret for favouring Denmark and being too autocratic, though she is generally thought to have been highly regarded in Norway and respected in Denmark and Sweden. She was painted in a negative light in contemporary religious chronicles, as she had no qualms suppressing the Church to promote royal power. Margaret is known in Denmark as "Margrethe I" to distinguish her from the current queen, who chose to be known as Margrethe II in recognition of her predecessor.

Early years and marriage
Margaret was born in March 1353 as the sixth and youngest child of King Valdemar IV and Helvig of Schleswig. She was born in the prison of Søborg Castle, where her father had already confined her mother. She was baptised in Roskilde and in 1359, at the age of six, engaged to the 18-year-old King Haakon VI of Norway, the youngest son of the Swedish-Norwegian king Magnus IV & VII. As part of the marriage contract it is presumed that a treaty was signed ensuring Magnus the assistance of King Valdemar in a dispute with his second son, Eric "XII" of Sweden, who in 1356 held dominion over Southern Sweden. Margaret's marriage was thus a part of the Nordic power struggle. There was dissatisfaction with this in some circles, and the political activist Bridget of Sweden described the agreement in a letter to the Pope as "children playing with dolls". The goal of the marriage for King Valdemar was regaining Scania, which since 1332 had been mortgaged to Sweden. Per contemporary sources, the marriage contract contained an agreement to give Helsingborg Castle back to Denmark, but that was not enough for Valdemar, who in June 1359 took a large army across Øresund and soon occupied Scania. The attack was ostensibly to support Magnus against Erik, but in June 1359, Erik died. As a result, the balance of power changed, and all agreements between Magnus and Valdemar were terminated, including the marriage contract between Margaret and Haakon.

This did not result in the withdrawal of Valdemar from Scania; he instead continued his conquests on the island of Gotland in the Baltic Sea. Visby, which was populated by Germans, was the main town on the island and was the key to domination of the Baltic Sea. On 27 July 1361 a battle was fought between a well-equipped Danish army and an array of local Gotland peasants. The Danes won the battle and took Visby, while the Germans did not take part. King Magnus and the Hanseatic League could not disregard this provocation, and a trade embargo against Denmark was immediately enacted, with agreement about necessary military action. At the same time, negotiations opened between King Magnus and Henry of Holstein about a marriage between Haakon and the latter's sister Elizabeth. On 17 December 1362, a ship left with Elizabeth bound for Sweden. A storm, however, diverted her to the Danish island Bornholm, where the archbishop of Lund declared the wedding a violation of church law because Haakon had already been engaged to Margaret. The Swedish and Hanseatic armies also ultimately withdrew from their siege of Helsingborg. Following this, a truce was concluded with the Hanseatic States and King Magnus abandoning the war, meaning the marriage of the now 10-year-old Margaret and King Haakon was again relevant. The wedding was held in Copenhagen on 9 April 1363.

The marriage of Haakon and Margaret was an alliance, and Margaret likely remained in Denmark for some time after the wedding, but ultimately was taken to Akershus in Oslo Fjord where she was raised by Merete Ulvsdatter. Merete Ulvsdatter was a distinguished noblewoman and daughter of Bridget of Sweden, as well as the wife of Knut Algotsson, who was one of King Magnus's faithful followers. Margaret was brought up with Merete Ulvsdatter's daughter Ingegerd, who likely instructed her in matters of religion and monarchy. Merete's daughters, Ingegerd and Catherine, became her closest female friends, with Margaret later showing favoritism to Ingegerd, who became an abbess, as well as her monastery. It is also likely, though, that her promotion of the Bridgettines was also out of piety and political interest to help the process of integration. Her academic studies were probably limited, but it is assumed that in addition to reading and writing she also was instructed in statecraft. She displayed an early talent for ruling and appears to have held real power.

In the years after Margaret's wedding Scandinavia saw a series of major political upheavals. A few months after her wedding, her only brother, Christopher, Duke of Lolland, died, leaving her father without an obvious male heir. In 1364 the Swedish nobles deposed Magnus and Margaret's husband King Haakon from the Swedish throne and elected Albert of Mecklenburg as king of Sweden.

Regency 

Her first act after her father's death in 1375 was to procure the election of her infant son Olaf as king of Denmark, despite the claims of her elder sister Ingeborg's husband Duke Henry III of Mecklenburg and their son Albert. Margaret insisted that Olaf be proclaimed rightful heir of Sweden, among his other titles. He was too young to rule in his own right, and Margaret proved herself a competent and shrewd ruler in the years that followed.  On the death of Haakon in 1380, Olaf succeeded him as King of Norway. Olaf died suddenly in 1387, aged 17, and Margaret, who had ruled both kingdoms in his name, was chosen Regent of Norway and Denmark in the following year. She had already proven her keen statesmanship by recovering possession of Schleswig from the Holstein-Rendsburg Counts. The Counts had held it for more than a generation and received it back as a fief by the Compact of Nyborg in 1386, but under such stringent conditions that the Danish Crown received all the advantages of the arrangement. By this compact, the often rebellious Jutish nobility lost the support they had previously enjoyed in Schleswig and Holstein. Margaret, free from fear of domestic sedition, could now give her undivided attention to Sweden, where mutinous nobles, led by Birger (son of Bridget and brother of Martha), were already in arms against their unpopular King Albert. Several of the powerful nobles wrote to Margaret that if she would help rid Sweden of Albert, she would become their regent. She quickly gathered an army and invaded Sweden.

At a conference held at Dalaborg Castle in March 1388, the Swedes were compelled to accept all of Margaret's conditions, elected her "Sovereign Lady and Ruler", and committed themselves to accept any king she chose to appoint. Albert, who had called her "King Pantsless" returned from Mecklenburg with an army of mercenaries.  On 24 February 1389, the decisive battle took place at either Aasle or Falan near Falköping. General Henrik Parow, the Mecklenburger commander of Margaret's forces, was killed in battle, but he managed to win it for her. Margaret was now the omnipotent mistress of three kingdoms.

Stockholm, then almost entirely a German city, still held out.  Fear of Margaret induced both the Mecklenburg princes and the Wendish towns to hasten to its assistance; and the Baltic and the North Sea speedily swarmed with the privateers of the Victual Brothers.  The Hanseatic League intervened, and under the Compact of Lindholm (1395), Margaret released Albert on his promise to pay 60,000 marks within three years. Meanwhile, the Hansa were to hold Stockholm as surety. Albert failed to pay his ransom within the stipulated time, and the Hansa surrendered Stockholm to Margaret in September 1398 in exchange for commercial privileges.

Eric of Pomerania

It had been understood that Margaret should, at the first convenient opportunity, provide the three kingdoms with a king who was to be a kinsman of all the three old dynasties, although in Norway it was specified that she would continue ruling alongside the new king, while in Sweden, the nobles assured Margaret that they were content to do without a king throughout her lifetime, which they hoped would be long. In 1389 she proclaimed her great-nephew, Bogislav, who changed his name to Eric of Pomerania (grandson of Henry of Mecklenburg), king of Norway, having adopted him and his sister Catherine. In 1396, homage was rendered to him in Denmark and Sweden, while Margaret once again assumed the regency during his minority.

Union of Kalmar
On 20 July, Margaret capitalized on the general rejoicing by publishing the famous Treaty of Kalmar, "a masterly document that sealed the union of Norway, Sweden and Denmark". The date she chose was no coincidence - it was the Feast Day of St. Margaret of Antioch, who like the Lady King herself, was cast off by her father and thrown into prison. The Treaty proposed “everlasting union”, which reflected her dearest ambition, that “all three realms should exist together in harmony and love, and whatever befalleth one, war and rumors of war, or the onslaught of foreigners, that shall be for all three, and each kingdom shall help the others in all fealty ...and hereafter the Nordic realms shall have one king, and not several". 

Well aware of regional pride and prejudice, Margaret played a careful strategy, assuring her subjects that each state would be governed according to the laws and customs of each, no new laws would be introduced without the consent of the subjects, officials from governors to soldiers would be recruited from the native populations, thus showing her subjects that they would enjoy every benefit of union without any threat to national identity. To weld the united kingdoms still more closely together, Margaret summoned a congress of the three Councils of the Realm to Kalmar in June 1397, and on Trinity Sunday, 17 June, Eric was crowned king of Denmark, Norway and Sweden. The Act of Union resulting from this was never completed. Scholars continue to debate the reasons, but the Union existed de facto through the early 16th century reign of King Christian II, and the union of Denmark and Norway continued until 1814.

A few years after the Kalmar Union, the 18-year-old Eric was declared of age and homage was rendered to him in all his three kingdoms, although Margaret was the effective ruler of Scandinavia throughout her lifetime.

Kalmar Union and royal policy
So long as the union was insecure, Margaret had tolerated the presence of the Riksråd, but their influence was minor and the Royal authority remained supreme. The offices of High Constable and Earl Marshal were left vacant; the Danehof fell into ruin, and "the great Queen, an ideal despot", ruled through her court officials, who served as a superior kind of clerk. In any event, law and order were well maintained and the licence of the nobility was sternly repressed. The kingdoms of Sweden and Norway were treated as integral parts of the Danish State, and national aspirations were frowned upon or checked, though Norway, being more loyal, was treated more indulgently than Sweden.

In 1396, according to Grethe Jacobsen, she issued an ordinance that one should to a higher degree than hitherto respect and enforce peace towards church (pax dei), houses, farms, legal assemblies, workers in the fields – and women, expressed in the word “kvindefred”. Jacobsen believes that as punishment for rape was normally not associated with the other forms for upholding peace in the tradition of pax dei, this may be an expression of Margrete's perception of women as being particularly vulnerable in times of unrest, and for her own interpretation of the ruler as protector of personae miserabiles, which included maidens and widows. Another testament was her dispositions of 1411 through which she distributed the sum of 500 marcs among the women who had been ‘violated and debased’ during the wars between Sweden and Denmark 1388–1389.

Margaret recovered for the Crown all the landed property that had been alienated in the troubled times before the reign of Valdemar IV. This so-called reduktion, or land-recovery, was carried out with the utmost rigour, and hundreds of estates fell into the hands of the crown. She also reformed the Danish currency, substituting good silver coins for the old and worthless copper tokens, to the great advantage both of herself and of the state. She always had large sums of money at her disposal, and much of it was given to charity.

According to Thomas Kingston Derry, Margaret tried to provide the union with a sound economic basis. In the process, each of her measures (recovery of crown lands from nobility and the church, new taxes and new coins) hurt the interests of powerful classes, but she prevented them from having leadership by making little use of separate councils of her three kingdoms, relying on a body of civil and ecclesiastical officials she chose with great skills instead. She placed Danes in Swedish and Norwegian bishoprics, while royal estates and castles were managed by castellans and bailiffs of foreign extraction. While this has been criticized as promoting Danes at the expense of Swedish and Norwegian people, Derry opines that considering she employed more Germans in her native Denmark than elsewhere, she was mainly interested in securing a loyal and efficient administration. 

She travelled much, in her later years is said to have spent more time in Sweden than in Denmark. She encouraged intermarriages among the nobility of three realms. Her piety is well-known, and she gave strong backing to the canonisation of St.Brigitta, helped to make Vadstena into a strong cultural centre and encouraged the spread of "Brigittine language", which led to many Swedish expressions coming into use among Danes and Norwegians.  

In contrast with the foreign policy of her venturesome father, Margaret's was circumspect and unswervingly neutral in the bloody war between France and England as well as other European conflicts. However, she spared no pains to recover lost Danish territory. She purchased the island of Gotland from its actual possessors, Albert of Mecklenburg and the Livonian Order, and the greater part of Schleswig was regained in the same way.

In 1402 Margaret entered into negotiations with King Henry IV of England about the possibility of a double-wedding alliance between England and the Nordic Union. The proposal was for King Eric to marry Henry's daughter Philippa, and for Henry's son, the Prince of Wales and future Henry V of England, to marry Eric's sister Catherine. According to Marc Shell, Margaret's vision was that one day, two unions would unite to recreate Cnut the Great's Empire of the North. The English side wanted these weddings to seal an offensive alliance that could have led the Nordic kingdoms to become involved in the Hundred Years' War against France. Margaret followed a consistent policy of not becoming involved in binding alliances and foreign wars, and therefore rejected the English proposals. However, although there was no double wedding, Eric married the 13-year-old Philippa, daughter of Henry IV of England and Mary de Bohun, at Lund on 26 October 1406, sealing a purely defensive alliance. For Eric's sister Catherine, a wedding was arranged with John, Count Palatine of Neumarkt. Margaret thus acquired a South German ally, who could be useful as a counterweight to the North German Princes and cities.

Death

In 1412, Margaret tried to recover Schleswig, and thus entered a war with Holstein. Before that she had managed the recovery of Finland and Gotland. While winning the war, Margaret died suddenly on board her ship in Flensburg Harbor.

In October 1412, she set sail from Seeland in her ship. She attended several debates, which reportedly had brought matters to a state of promising forwardness. On retiring to her vessel though, with the intention of leaving the port, "she was seized with sudden and violent illness."  Margaret apparently foresaw the end of her life, as she ordered thirty seven marks to be paid to the nearby monastery of Campen for a perpetual mass for her soul. Beyond this, there is no discussion in the historical record regarding her demise. She died on the night of 28 October 1412, the vigil of St. Simon and St. Jude. Possible scenarios that have been suggested include plague, shock from the death of Abraham Brodersson (whom 18th century authors have alleged was the father of a daughter Margareta had, while 19th century authors have blamed the story on a mistranslation), or poisoning by Eric.

Her sarcophagus, made by the Lübeck sculptor Johannes Junge in 1423, is situated behind the high altar in the Roskilde Cathedral, near Copenhagen. She had left property to the cathedral on the condition that Masses for her soul would be said regularly in the future. This was discontinued in 1536 during the Protestant Reformation, though a special bell is still rung twice daily in commemoration.

Appearance and personality

She has been described as a beautiful woman with dark hair, dark eyes, an intimidating gaze and the aura of absolute authority. She was highly energetic well into her old age, autocratic and indomitable, at the same time also described as wise, just, tactful and kind. Hudson Strode writes "Margaret, who, like St. Bridget, possessed the masculine quality of indomitability, was undoubtedly the strongest. No male public official ever worked harder at his job. She used her constructive ability, her diplomacy, and her force of will to make the Union a success and to maintain the royal prerogative."

Ambiguities concerning titles
In Denmark Margaret was called "sovereign lady and lord and guardian of the entire kingdom of Denmark" (Norway and Sweden later bestowed on her similar titles). This special, double-gendered title bestowed upon the holder the power and authority of a man (lord), of a woman (sovereign lady) and of the gender-neutral guardian. Later, when Erik was elected King of Norway in 1392, she renounced this title in Norway, and in 1396, when he was crowned as King of Denmark and Sweden, she stopped the use of this title altogether, although she continued as Regent.

She only styled herself Queen of Denmark in 1375, usually referring to herself as "Margaret, by the grace of God, daughter of Valdemar King of Denmark" and "Denmark's rightful heir" when referring to her position in Denmark. Her title in Denmark was derived from her father King Valdemar IV of Denmark. Others simply referred to her as the "Lady Queen", without specifying what she was queen of, but not so Pope Boniface IX, who in his letters styled her "our beloved daughter in Christ, Margaret, most excellent queen of Denmark, Sweden and Norway". ("Carissime in Christo filie Margarete Dacie Suecie et Norwegie regine illustri".)

When she married Haakon VI of Norway in 1363, he was co-King of Sweden, making Margaret queen consort, and despite being deposed, they never relinquished the title. In theory, the Swedes' expulsion of Albert I in 1389 simply restored Margaret to her original position. From 24 February 1389 to 28 October 1412, she was Queen of Denmark, Norway and Sweden and founder of the Kalmar Union, which united the Scandinavian countries for over a century. She acted as queen regnant of Denmark, although in those days it was not the Danish custom for a woman to reign.

Reputation

E.C. Otte writes in 1874, that "[i]f Margaret could have been certain of being followed on the throne by rulers as able and just as she had been, this Act of the Union of Calmar might have worked for the good of the three kingdoms. For it was quite true, as the Queen said, that each one alone was a poor weak state, open to danger from every side, but that the three united would make a monarchy, strong enough to defy the attacks and schemes of the Hanse traders and all foes from the side of Germany, and would keep the Baltic clear of danger from foreigners. However no ruler came after Queen Margaret equal to her, as there had been none before her to be compared to her."

According to Imsen, her political genius has never been contested, but her motives have always been the target of much debate. During the first half of the nineteenth century, she was usually depicted as an idealist who fought to counterbalance the German influence. After the defeat of Denmark by the Prussians in 1864, image of Margaret the nationalist prevailed. In recent times, she has been increasingly regarded as a Machiavellist who primarily fought for her power and dynastic interests.

In The Middle Ages: Dictionary of World Biography, Volume 2, McFadden opines that "Margaret 's achievement at a time when all Scandinavia was being threatened by German cultural and economic domination was to unite the kingdoms and not only hold back the Germans but also regain lands lost to the south. At the time of her death, the Scandinavian Union was by far the most powerful force in the Baltic; it was also the second largest accumulation of European territory under a single sovereign."

Family tree

Sources

Citations

Bibliography
 
 
.
 .
 .
 .
 .
 .

Further reading
 Lindkvist, Thomas.

External links

 .

|-

|-

1353 births
1412 deaths
14th-century Swedish monarchs
15th-century Swedish monarchs
14th-century Norwegian monarchs
15th-century Norwegian monarchs
People from Gribskov Municipality
Valdemar IV of Denmark
Norwegian royal consorts
Margaret 1363
House of Estridsen
Rulers of Finland
Queens regnant in Europe
Women rulers of Finland
Kalmar Union
Burials at Roskilde Cathedral
Royal reburials
14th-century women rulers
15th-century women rulers
Regents of Denmark
Regents of Sweden
Regents of Norway
14th-century viceregal rulers
Swedish monarchs of German descent
14th-century monarchs of Denmark
15th-century monarchs of Denmark
15th-century Danish women
14th-century Danish women
14th-century Swedish people
14th-century Swedish women
15th-century Swedish people
15th-century Swedish women
14th-century Norwegian people
14th-century Norwegian women
15th-century Norwegian people
15th-century Norwegian women
Margaret I of Denmark
Queen mothers